Munich-Fasangarten station is a suburban railway station on the S3 line in Munich. Located just at the southeastern city limits, it serves areas including the former Ami-Siedlung, a neighborhood populated mostly U.S. military personnel and their dependents until the mid-1990s.

Notes

Fasangarten
Fasangarten